Dragonfish is the 2015 debut novel by writer Vu Tran. Dragonfish was #3 on the list of most checked out e-books in the year 2017 at the San Francisco Public Library.

Plot
Suzy, a mysterious Vietnamese woman, leaves her police officer husband, Robert, and her home in Oakland, California. She reappears in Las Vegas with a new husband, Sonny, a violent Vietnamese gambler and smuggler.  When Suzy vanishes again, Sonny blackmails Robert into finding her and the search leads them through the glitz and sleaze of Las Vegas's underbelly.

References

2015 American novels
American thriller novels
Vietnamese-American novels
W. W. Norton & Company books
2015 debut novels